Patrick Lefoulon (born 6 May 1958) is a French sprint canoeist who competed in the early 1980s. Competing in two Summer Olympics, he won a silver medal in the K-2 1000 m event at Los Angeles in 1984.

Lefoulon also won a gold in the K-2 10000 m event at the 1982 ICF Canoe Sprint World Championships in Belgrade.

References

Sports-reference.com profile

1958 births
Canoeists at the 1980 Summer Olympics
Canoeists at the 1984 Summer Olympics
French male canoeists
Living people
Olympic canoeists of France
Olympic silver medalists for France
Olympic medalists in canoeing
ICF Canoe Sprint World Championships medalists in kayak
Medalists at the 1984 Summer Olympics